Benoit Groulx (born March 6, 1985 in Montreal, Quebec) is a former Canadian football quarterback and was an offensive coordinator and quarterback coach for the Bishop's Gaiters of the Canadian Interuniversity Sport. He played five years as a quarterback in CIS football for the Laval Rouge et Or.

Groulx grew up in Montreal. He attended the Cégep du Vieux Montréal and played for the Vieux Montréal Spartiates winning the Bol D'or 3 times and twice being named most valuable player in the CEGEP AAA league, before enrolling at Université Laval to study sports administration.

University football
Though a few told him that he was too short, too slow, and had too little arm strength to compete at the university level, Groulx quickly impressed Laval head coach Glen Constantin at training camp. His performance in the regular season was equally impressive. Starting the season as a back-up, he came off the bench near the end of the week 2 game, when veteran William Leclerc was injured and again replaced Leclerc in week 3 this time mid-way through the second quarter and led a 61 to 15 victory over Bishop's Gaiters. His performance earned him the Quebec University Football League offensive player of the week honours in week 3 and the starting quarterback position. Groulx ended the regular season playing in 5 games with 1317 yards, 13 touchdowns, five interceptions, and 90 completions out of 132 passes, the highest completion percentage in the 2005 CIS football season. He also earned CIS offensive player of week 5 and QUFL player of the week honours for the Dunsmore Cup semi-finals 72–14 win over the Sherbrooke Vert et Or.

Groulx returned for his second season and equalled his 2005 season 68 percent completion average to again lead the nation with 170 completions in 250 passes for 2,422 yards, 12 touchdowns, and 6 interceptions over the 8 games of the regular season. His 2,422 yard passing performance set a new QUFL single season record and he was named the Jeff Russel Memorial Trophy winner as the most outstanding player in the Quebec conference and nominee for the national Hec Crighton Trophy. Groulx and the Rouge et Or went on to complete the year without a loss to win the 2006 Vanier Cup.

On January 14, 2010, Groulx was announced as the new offensive coordinator for the Bishop's Gaiters.

Regular Season Statistics

References

 
 
 
 
 http://www.sirc.ca/news_view.cfm?id=24853
 http://www.universitysport.ca/e/story_detail.cfm?id=13178
 http://www.globesports.com/servlet/story/RTGAM.20081120.wspt_cis20/GSStory/GlobeSportsFootball/home
 https://web.archive.org/web/20081206081325/http://www.universitysport.ca/e/football/story_detail.cfm?id=13200
 https://ca.sports.yahoo.com/top/news?slug=capress-ftbl_cis_quebec_awards&prov=capress&type=lgns

1985 births
Living people
Canadian football people from Montreal
Players of Canadian football from Quebec
Canadian football quarterbacks
Laval Rouge et Or football players